The 2009 All-Ireland Under-21 Hurling Championship was the 46th staging of the All-Ireland Under-21 Hurling Championship since its establishment by the Gaelic Athletic Association in 1964. The championship began on 20 May 2009 and ended on 13 September 2009.

Kilkenny entered the championship as the defending champions.

On 13 September 2009, Clare won the championship following a 0-15 to 0-14 defeat of Kilkenny in the All-Ireland final. This was their first All-Ireland title in the under-21 grade.

Results

Leinster Under-21 Hurling Championship

Quarter-finals

Semi-finals

Final

Munster Under-21 Hurling Championship

Quarter-final

Semi-finals

Final

Ulster Under-21 Hurling Championship

Quarter-final

Semi-finals

Final

All-Ireland Under-21 Hurling Championship

Semi-finals

Final

Top scorers

Overall

Single game

Top goalkeepers

Clean sheets

Championship statistics

Miscellaneous
 After losing twelve provincial finals throughout the history of the competition, Clare finally triumph and claim their first Munster title.  The team subsequently progresses to claim their first ever All-Ireland title.
 The All-Ireland final is the first ever championship meeting between Clare and Kilkenny.

External links
 General information on the 2009 championship

References

Under-21
All-Ireland Under-21 Hurling Championship